Mantas Kvedaravičius (23 June  1976 – 30 March 2022) was a Lithuanian filmmaker, anthropologist, and archaeologist known for war reporting in hostile areas.

Life and career

Kvedaravičius held a PhD in social anthropology from the University of Cambridge, and was an associate professor at Vilnius University. His doctoral thesis concerns "Knots of absence: death, dreams, and disappearances at the limits of law in the counter-terrorism zone of Chechnya" (Cambridge University, 2012). War-torn Chechnya, one of the republics of the Russian Federation, is also the setting of his 2011 documentary film, Barzakh ("Limbo"). His next documentary film, published in 2016, focuses on the Ukrainian port city of Mariupol, which in the years 2014–15 had come under the attacks of separatist troops. In 2019, Kvedaravičius's first feature film appeared, Partenonas (Parthenon), set in Athens, Odessa, and Istanbul. Based on several years of ethnographic research, it is a movie about the enigmatic workings of memory.
In arresting, often disconnected images, the pivotal character revives various lives he may have lived. "Memories betray him, but he knows for sure that in one of these lives, he will be killed."

Death
Working on yet another Mariupol documentary, Mantas Kvedaravičius was killed on 30 March 2022 during the Siege of Mariupol.
Lyudmyla Denisova, Ukraine's ombudsperson for human rights, alleged that Kvedaravičius "was taken prisoner by 'rashists', who later shot him. The occupiers threw the director's body out into the street". Kvedaravičius's friend, Hanna Bilobrova, reported that two days after his death, a Russian soldier had led her to his body. She said that he had been shot in the stomach, but there was "no blood on the ground" and no bullet hole in the clothes he was wearing. Bilobrova brought his body home to Lithuania.

Filmography

Documentaries

Barzakh (2011) 
Mariupolis (2016)
Mariupolis 2 (2022)

Feature film

Parthenon (Partenonas) (2019)
Prologos (2021)

Awards
2022: Lithuanian National Prize for Culture and ArtsBarzakhAmnesty International Film Prize, 2011 Berlin International Film Festival
Best Film, 2011 Belgrade Documentary and Short Film Festival
Best Documentary, 2011 Lithuanian Film Awards
Amnesty International Film Prize, 2012 Ljubljana International Film Festival
Grand Prize, 2011 Tallinn Black Nights Film Festival
Best Lithuanian Debut, 2011 Vilnius International Film FestivalMariupolisBest Documentary, 2016 Lithuanian Film Awards
Best Director, 2016 Vilnius International Film FestivalMariupolis 2''
European Documentary, 2022 European Film Awards

References

External links
 

1976 births
2022 deaths
Alumni of Sidney Sussex College, Cambridge
Deaths by firearm in Ukraine
Lithuanian film directors
People from Biržai
People killed in the 2022 Russian invasion of Ukraine
Civilians killed in the Russian invasion of Ukraine
Academic staff of Vilnius University